Wladimir Yordanoff (28 March 1954 – 6 October 2020) was a French actor of Bulgarian origin. He appeared in more than sixty films since 1979.

Yordanoff died on 6 October 2020, aged 66.

Theater

Filmography

References

External links 
 

1954 births
2020 deaths
French male film actors
Monegasque male film actors
French people of Bulgarian descent
20th-century French male actors
21st-century French male actors
French male stage actors
Monegasque emigrants to France